Stéphane Mertens (born 14 May 1959 in Paris, France) is a Belgian former professional motorcycle road racer.

Mertens made his Grand Prix debut in 1984, racing in the 250cc class. He also won the 1984 250cc Belgian Road Racing National Championship. He continued racing in the 250cc Grands Prix in 1985, 1986 and 1987. In  he made the switch to racing production based motorcycles in the inaugural Superbike World Championship. Mertens raced for Bimota in 88 and 89, and stayed in the Superbike class until  with his best result being a second-place finish behind Fred Merkel in the  season, while riding for Honda. In 1995 he began to compete in the motorcycle FIM Endurance World Championship, winning that title in 1995 and 2002. Mertens was a member of the winning team at the 1990 24 Hours of Le Mans.

References

1959 births
Living people
Belgian motorcycle racers
Superbike World Championship riders
250cc World Championship riders
British Superbike Championship riders